
For the Good Times is a 1971 studio album by Dean Martin arranged by Ernie Freeman and produced by Jimmy Bowen.

The album peaked at 113 on the Billboard 200 and 41 on the Billboard top Country Albums chart. It was reissued on CD by Capitol Records in 2006 and Hip-O Records in 2009. Though Martin was recording infrequently at this stage of his career, this was the second album he recorded in 1970.

Reception

The initial Billboard review from 6 February 1971 commented that "Dean Martin is an old timer who knows how to make time with the new crop of writers". William Ruhlmann on Allmusic.com gave the album two and a half stars out of five. Ruhlmann said that "Martin handled the material with his usual careless aplomb, but the result was just another record, no better or worse than its immediate predecessors".

Track listing 
Side One:  
 "For the Good Times" (Kris Kristofferson) - 3:50
 "Marry Me" (Barry Mason, Les Reed) - 2:34
 "Georgia Sunshine" (Jerry Reed Hubbard) - 2:58
 "Invisible Tears" (Ned Miller, Sue Miller) - 2:10
 "Raindrops Keep Fallin' on My Head" (Burt Bacharach, Hal David) - 2:43

Side Two:  
 "A Perfect Mountain" (Gene Thomas) - 2:46
 "Raining in My Heart" (Felice and Boudleaux Bryant) - 2:37
 "She's a Little Bit of Country" (Harlan Howard) - 2:34
 "For Once in My Life" (Ron Miller, Orlando Murden) - 2:19
 "Sweetheart" (Barry Gibb, Maurice Gibb) - 2:40

Personnel 
 Dean Martin – vocals
 Ernie Freeman - arranger
 Ed Thrasher - art direction
 Eddie Brackett - engineer	
 Jimmy Bowen - record producer

References 

1971 albums
Dean Martin albums
Albums arranged by Ernie Freeman
Albums produced by Jimmy Bowen
Reprise Records albums